The Pacifica Hotel building is an historic structure located at 547 4th Avenue in the Gaslamp Quarter, San Diego, in the U.S. state of California. It was built in 1910.

See also
 List of Gaslamp Quarter historic buildings

References

External links

 

1910 establishments in California
Buildings and structures in San Diego
Gaslamp Quarter, San Diego
Hotel buildings completed in 1910
Hotels in San Diego